Baghor stone is an Upper Paleolithic archaeological object that was found in the Son river valley near the village of Medhauli, in the Sidhi District, Madhya Pradesh, India. The stone, interpreted as a cult object, was found at the site of Baghor I, which is located near the base of the Kaimur Escarpment. It was first excavated in 1980.

Baghor stone is a natural triangular piece of local sandstone; it is rather colourful, and had been decorated with yellow pigment. These types of stones may be found on top of the escarpment. The Baghor site, with all its many lithic artefacts, is dated between 9000 B.C and 8000 B.C.

Site description
The site was first excavated under the direction of archaeologists G. R. Sharma of Allahabad University and J. Desmond Clark of University of California, and assisted by Jonathan Mark Kenoyer and J.N. Pal.

This was determined as a short term occupation site. The floor was composed of rubble, and there was a lot of manufacturing waste from stone tool manufacture. Many varieties of backed blades and geometric microliths were found, as well as grinding stones and ring stones.

Later, as a lot of material was removed, a stone platform was identified, with the Baghor triangular stone in the center. This platform was interpreted as a site for ritual ceremonies. 

Thus, it took archaeologists quite a lot of time to correctly identify the original role and meaning of the Baghor stone.

Shakti worship
Numerous ethnographic comparisons have been made between the palaeolithic site of Baghor I and some of the other sites in the area that are still being honoured today by local peoples. Thus, Baghor site has been interpreted as the earliest mother goddess shrine in the subcontinent. Shakti worship is one of the local personifications of this tradition.

Specifically, the tribal groups Kol and Baiga, have been mentioned. Their primary subsistence has traditionally been hunting and gathering, and they currently worship at the sites rather similar to Baghor. These tribes have Dravidian affinities.

See also
Yantra
South Asian Stone Age

Notes

Bibliography

External links
Spirituality in India - A Cultural Perspective/Roots of Indian spirituality

Archaeological sites in Madhya Pradesh
Shaktism